Oncaeidae is a family of copepods, containing the following genera:
Archioncaea Böttger-Schnack & Huys, 1997
Conaea Giesbrecht, 1891
Epicalymma Heron, 1977
Monothula Böttger-Schnack & Huys, 2001
Oncaea Philippi, 1843
Spinoncaea Böttger-Schnack, 2003
Triconia Böttger-Schnack, 1999

References

Poecilostomatoida
Crustacean families